The 2014–15 Malian Première Division is the 50th edition of the highest club level football competition in Mali.

Standings

Mali
Malian Première Division seasons
football
football